Jarmuth, Hebrew: Yarmut (יַרְמוּת), was the name of two cities in the land of Canaan.

The Douai-Rheims version of the Bible has an alternative spelling, Jaramoth.

Jarmuth near Beit Shemesh

Jarmuth was an Amorite city in Canaan at the time of the Israelite settlement recorded in the Hebrew Bible. This Jarmuth is commonly identified with a modern site variously called Tel Yarmuth in Hebrew, Tel Jarmuth, or Khirbet el-Yarmûk in Arabic (grid position 147124PAL).<ref>{{cite book |last=Aharoni|first=Y. |author-link=Yohanan Aharoni |title=The Land of the Bible: A Historical Geography|edition=2 |publisher=Westminster Press |location=Philadelphia|year=1979|page=437 |language=en|isbn=0664242669 |oclc=6250553}} (original Hebrew edition: 'Land of Israel in Biblical Times - Historical Geography', Bialik Institute, Jerusalem (1962))</ref> The site is located on the south of Beit Shemesh, near Bayt Nattif, and is now a National Park. The Park spans over an area of 267 dunams (nearly 66 acres).

Jarmuth in Issachar
Jarmuth is not mentioned in the parallel list of Levitical cities in 1 Chronicles 6), but Ramoth is mentioned in its place. The site of the Issacharian Jarmuth is not yet known, but it is identified by some with the site of Kawkab el-Hawa, which if correct might also correspond to Second Temple period Agrippina.

References

Bibliography

 de Miroschedji, Pierre. (1990). The Early Bronze Age Fortifications at Tel Yarmut – An Interim Statement. Eretz-Israel: Archaeological, Historical, and Geographical Studies. Volume 21. 
  (Snippet view).
 Robinson, Edward (1856). Biblical Researches in Palestine''. Vol. II, section XI, London, p. 17.

Hebrew Bible places
Levitical cities
Canaanite cities
Archaeological sites in Israel
Tells (archaeology)